Robert Edward Jager (born August 25, 1939) is an American composer, music theorist and a conductor.

Life 
Jager was born in Binghamton, New York on August 25, 1939. From 1962 to 1965 he was arranger/composer for the US-Navy Armed Forces School of Music. He completed his studies and graduated from the University of Michigan in 1968. He then went on to be the lecturer in composition and directing at Old Dominion University in Norfolk, Virginia. In 1971, he left Old Dominion University to become a professor at Tennessee Technological University in Cookeville, TN from which he retired in 2001.

In his career, Jager has received numerous honors for his works, including being the only three-time winner of the American Bandmasters Association Ostwald Composition Award (1964, 1968, 1972.)

Works

Works for Orchestra

1973 A Child's Garden of Verses for Soprano and Chamber Orchestra
1989 The Pied Piper OF Hamelin for narrator and orchestra
1994 Kokopelli Dances for flute and orchestra
1996 Suite from “Edvard Munch”
2000 Like A White Daisy Looks
2001 The Grandeur OF God for Chorus and Orchestra
2010 Esprit de Corps
1996 I Dream of Peace for children's choir and chamber orchestra
2009 Of Things Remembered for string orchestra
2015 The War Prayer for narrator and orchestra

Works for Wind Ensemble

1957 First Suite for Band
1963 Stars and Bars March
1964 Symphony for Band
1964 Second Suite for Band
1965 Sinfonia Nobilissima
1966 Third Suite for Band
1966 Chorale and Toccata
1967 March “Dramatic"
1968 Diamond Variations
1968 The Tennessean March
1968 Variations on A Theme of Robert Schumann
1969 Sinfonietta
1970 Tour de Force
1971 Courage to Serve
1972 Apocalypse
1975 Preamble
1975 Shivaree
1976 Japanese Prints
1976 Prelude: Concert Liberte
1976 Symphony No. 2
1977 Concerto No. 2 for Alto Saxophone
1978 Carpathian Sketches
1978 Jubilate
1979 Pastorale and Country Dance
1981 Concerto for Tuba
1982 Tableau
1983 Prelude on an Old Southern Hymn
1984 March of the Dragon Masters
1984 Esprit de Corps
1984 Concerto for Percussion and Wind Ensemble
1985 Concerto for Euphonium and Band
1985 Triumph and Tradition
1986 Colonial Airs and Dances
1986 Eagle Rock Overture
1986 Heroic Saga
1986 Old Time Spirit
1987 Under the Big Top
1987 A Commemorative Suite
1990 Fourth Suite for Band
1991 Epilogue: "Lest We Forget"
1991 Uncommon Valor - March
1992 Lord, Guard and Guide
1993 Meditations on a Scottish Hymn Tune
1993 Three Chinese Miniatures:
 I. The Wind
 II. Sen Jin De Ma (A Maiden)
 III. A Love Song of Kang Ting City
1995 The Last Full Measure of Devotion
1999 Variants on the Air Force Hymn
2000 Hebraic Rhapsody
2001 Joan of Arc
2001 Mystic Chords of Memory
2004 Concert in The park
2004 Highland Fling (originally named Covenant)
2004 In Sunshine and Shadows for Soprano and Winds
2004 Baritone Solos for Mixed Choir
2006 Eternal Vigilance
2010 Scenes from "Penn's Woods"
2010 A Sea of Glass Mingled with Fire
I. Dance at the “Glory Hole”
II. Of “Sea Forms,” Venetians and Putti”
III. The Boathouse Gang

References

External links 
Official site

American male composers
21st-century American composers
Living people
1939 births
People from Binghamton, New York
Distinguished Service to Music Medal recipients
University of Michigan alumni
21st-century American male musicians